Besant Ravi (born R. Ravi Kumar; 1 June 1970) is an Indian actor and stunt choreographer. He has played antagonistic supporting roles in Tamil, Hindi and several other Indian language films.

Early life
Besant Ravi, who was born and brought up in Chennai, was a bike mechanic in his early stages of life, and all through his childhood days, he grew up watching film shootings near his house in Besant Nagar. He soon became familiar with the artists and technicians on the sets. Ravi is an expert in Mixed martial arts and boxing. He got his first break in cinema in the movie Lucky Man.

Career
He got his first break in cinema in the movie Lucky Man, in which he performed a solo stunt, then he got trained professionally for cinema by stunt master Pandiyan. He started his career as a fighter and later moved into acting in several action sequences. Later, he got many offers to enter into the acting arena and got busy with acting. Director S. Shankar's Mudhalvan was noted among his projects.

Filmography

Tamil 

Lucky Man (1995)
Mudhalvan (1999)
Ennamma Kannu (2000)
Kushi (2000)
Vanna Thamizh Pattu (2000)
Appu (2000)
Parthen Rasithen (2000)
Thamizh (2002)
Dheena (2001)
Dhost (2001)
Citizen (2001)
Aanandham (2001)
Majunu (2001)
Ezhumalai (2002)
Charlie Chaplin (2002)
Thamizhan (2002)
Raajjiyam (2002)
Thenkasi Pattanam (2002)
Raja (2002)
Manasellam (2003)
Three Roses (2003)
Villain (2002)
Chokka Thangam (2003)
Saamy (2003)
Dum (2003)
Pudhiya Geethai (2003)
Sivamani (2003)
Anjaneya (2003)
Kuththu (2004)
Yuga (2006)
Suyetchai MLA (2006)
Agaram (2007)
Arul (2004)
Jore (2004)
Sullan (2004)
Aayudham (2005)
Maayavi (2005)
Anniyan (2005)
Aadhikkam (2005)
Englishkaran (2005)
Chinna (2005)
Kusthi (2006)
Thagapansamy (2006)
Saravana (2006)
Sudesi (2006)
Thalaimagan (2006)
Thagapansamy (2006)
Thalai Nagaram (2006)
Suriyan (2006)
Pokkiri (2007)
Deepavali (2007)
Mayavi (2007)
Nam Naadu (2007)
Maa Madurai (2007)
Thiru Ranga (2007)
Thotta (2008)
Ellam Avan Seyal (2008)
Vasool (2008)
Kabadi Kabadi (2008)
Yogi (2009)
Perumal (2009)
Thoranai (2009)
Ainthaam Padai (2009)
Suriyan Satta Kalloori (2009)
Singam (2010)
Pen Singam (2010)
Irumbukkottai Murattu Singam (2010)
Nagaram Marupakkam (2010)
Ponnar Shankar (2011)
Vai Raja Vai (2015)
Puthagam (2013)
Pattathu Yaanai (2013)
Soan Papdi (2013)
Tenaliraman (2014)
Kakki Sattai (2015)
Eli (2015)
Bhooloham (2015)
Yennai Arindhaal (2015)
Kaaki Sattai (2015)
Gethu (2016)
Saagasam (2016)
Bairavaa (2017)
Sathura Adi 3500 (2017)
Goli Soda 2 (2018)
The Legend (2022)
Kaatteri (2022)

Telugu 

Nenu Premisthunnanu (1997)
Tholi Valapu (2001) 
Hanuman Junction (2001)
Commander Jayanthi (2002)
Villain (2003)
Andhrawala (2004)
Suryam (2004)
Annavaram (2006)
Madesha (2008)
Bujjigadu (2008)
Pistha (2009)
Ragada (2010)
Aagadu (2014)

Malayalam 

Black (2004)
Thommanum Makkalum (2005)
Aandavan (2008)
Chattambinadu (2009)
Black Stallion (2010)
Shikkar (2010)
Christian Brothers (2011)
Manthrikan (2012)
Aravindante Athithikal (2018)

Kannada 
Veera Kannadiga (2004)
Nalla (2005)
Shy (2006)
Madesha (2008)
Shivamani (2009)
Santhu Straight Forward (2016)

Hindi 
Singham (2011)
Policegiri (2013)
Chennai Express (2013)
Golmaal Again (2017)
Simmba (2018)

Bengali 
Bikram Singha: The Lion Is Back (2012)

Television

References

1970 births
Living people
Tamil male actors
Indian action choreographers
Indian male film actors
20th-century Indian male actors
21st-century Indian male actors
Male actors in Tamil cinema
Male actors in Hindi cinema